Gideon Abraham Louw (born September 4, 1987) is a South African swimmer. He competed at the 2008 Summer Olympics in Beijing, and at the 2012 Summer Olympics in London.

See also
 List of Commonwealth Games medallists in swimming (men)

References

1987 births
Living people
South African male swimmers
Olympic swimmers of South Africa
Swimmers at the 2008 Summer Olympics
Swimmers at the 2012 Summer Olympics
Commonwealth Games silver medallists for South Africa
Commonwealth Games bronze medallists for South Africa
Commonwealth Games medallists in swimming
African Games gold medalists for South Africa
African Games medalists in swimming
African Games bronze medalists for South Africa
Swimmers at the 2010 Commonwealth Games
Competitors at the 2007 All-Africa Games
Competitors at the 2011 All-Africa Games
21st-century South African people
20th-century South African people
Auburn Tigers men's swimmers
Indian River State Pioneers athletes
Medallists at the 2010 Commonwealth Games